Sorrell and Son is a 1927 American silent drama film released on December 2, 1927 and nominated for the Academy Award for Best Director at the 1st Academy Awards the following year. The film was based on the 1925 novel of the same name by Warwick Deeping, Sorrell and Son, which became and remained a bestseller throughout the 1920s and 1930s.
 
The screenplay was adapted by Elizabeth Meehan. It was written and directed by Herbert Brenon. Filming took place in England.

Remake
The story has been remade twice, once in 1934 as Sorrell and Son, with H.B. Warner repeating his role as Stephen Sorrell, and once as a British television serial in 1984.

Preservation status
The 1927 version was considered a lost film for many years. However, the Academy Film Archive restored both an almost-complete copy of Sorrell and Son and a trailer for the film, in 2004 and 2006, respectively.

Cast 
 H. B. Warner as Stephen Sorrell
 Anna Q. Nilsson as Dora Sorrell
 Mickey McBan as Kit (as a child)
 Carmel Myers as Flo Palfrey
 Lionel Belmore as John Palfrey
 Norman Trevor as Thomas Roland
 Betsy Ann Hisle as Molly (as a child)
 Louis Wolheim as Buck
 Paul McAllister as Dr. Orange
 Alice Joyce as Fanny Garland
 Nils Asther as Christopher 'Kit' Sorrell
 Mary Nolan as Molly Roland

See also
List of rediscovered films

References

External links
www.warwickdeeping.com

Sorrell and Son at Virtual History
Stills at the Alice Joyce website
Still at silenthollywood.com

1927 films
American black-and-white films
Lost American films
American silent feature films
1920s English-language films
Films directed by Herbert Brenon
British silent feature films
Films based on British novels
Films set in England
Silent American drama films
British drama films
1920s rediscovered films
1927 drama films
Rediscovered American films
1920s American films
1920s British films